Habscht is a commune in central Luxembourg, in the canton of Capellen.

It was established on 1 January 2018 from the amalgamation of the communes of Hobscheid and Septfontaines.

Populated places
The commune consists of the following villages:

 Hobscheid Section:
 Eischen (seat)
 Hobscheid
 Eechelsbarrière (lieu-dit)
 Felleschmillen (lieu-dit)
 Gaichel (lieu-dit)
 Jénkenhaff (lieu-dit)
 Kreuzerbuch (lieu-dit)
 Seemillen (lieu-dit)

 Septfontaines Section:
 Greisch
 Roodt-sur-Eisch 
 Septfontaines
 Simmerfarm
 Simmerschmelz
 Leesbach

References

 
Communes in Capellen (canton)
Towns in Luxembourg